Predrag Rusevski (born 3 August 1983) is a retired professional Macedonian tennis player. He has been the Macedonia Davis Cup team's most active player ever.

Career
Rusevski has played most of his career on the Futures and Challenger circuit.  He has played in one ATP tournament, in 2007 in Umag, losing to Viktor Troicki.

Singles titles (10)

References

External links
 

1983 births
Living people
Macedonian male tennis players